Longwy station is a railway station serving the town Longwy, Meurthe-et-Moselle department, northeastern France. It is situated on the Longuyon–Mont-Saint-Martin railway. The station is served by regional trains towards Luxembourg, Charleville-Mézières and Nancy.

References

External links
 

Railway stations in Grand Est
Railway stations on CFL Line 70